MBDA UK is the British division of the pan-European missile systems company MBDA (itself a joint venture of Airbus, BAE Systems and Leonardo). Formed in 2001, the company has produced a range of missile systems, including the CAMM missile family, Storm Shadow cruise missile, ASRAAM air-to-air missile and Meteor beyond-visual-range missile (BVRAAM).

History

Formation and early years
MBDA UK was first incorporated in 1996 as Brathwell, based in Cardiff, before being renamed Matra BAe Dynamics UK shortly afterwards, serving as the UK-based part of the Anglo-French missile systems company, Matra BAe Dynamics. In 2001, Matra BAe Dynamics merged with the French EADS Aerospatiale Matra Missiles and Anglo-Italian Alenia Marconi Systems to form a pan-European missile systems company, named MBDA. After the merge, national subsidiaries were created from the predecessor companies in the United Kingdom, France and Italy and named MBDA UK, MBDA France and MBDA Italy, respectively. MBDA UK inherited various products which were designed and manufactured by its predecessor companies, including Rapier and Sea Wolf surface-to-air missiles, which were originally manufactured by the British Aircraft Corporation (BAC).

In 2001, the company delivered its Storm Shadow cruise missile to the Royal Air Force, which it had co-developed with the French subsidiary of Matra BAe Dynamics. Whilst the weapon was still in trials, it was pushed into operational service for use by the RAF during Operation Telic in Iraq. The following year also saw the delivery of the ASRAAM short-range air-to-air missile, which had been in testing since 1998. The missile was delivered 37 months behind schedule, due largely to hardware and software technical difficulties, however the UK Ministry of Defence also blamed the delays on MBDA for "failing to meet contractual performance".

The company became the prime contractor for the Meteor programme in 2002 to deliver a beyond-visual-range air-to-air missile (BVRAAM) to the RAF. Work for this missile was also subcontracted to its sister companies in France, Italy and Germany. Several years later, in 2005, the company delivered its Brimstone air-launched ground-attack missile to the RAF. Its first operational deployment came in 2008 during Operation Herrick in Afghanistan.

In 2009, the company made its first export sale for ASRAAM to Australia. This was followed shortly after by an export sale to Saudi Arabia.

2010–present

By 2010, the company had begun work on the Fire Shadow loitering munition for the British Army. The company's Brimstone missile also received increased publicity following the launch of Operation Ellamy in Libya and Operation Shader in Iraq and Syria, with politicians and analysts highlighting the missile's low risk of collateral damage. This resulted in increased interest in the missile on the export market, in particular by the United States and France. The company further developed Brimstone into a range of variants, including a sea-launched Brimstone Sea Spear, Brimstone 3 and an entirely new missile, currently named SPEAR 3, which uses technology derived from Brimstone.

The Lancaster House Treaties signed in 2010 by the British and French governments resulted in the company collaborating with MBDA France on several missile projects, including the Future
Anti-Surface Guided Weapon (Heavy) (FASGW(H)) anti-ship missile, later named Sea Venom, and a new hypersonic cruise missile, later named Perseus.

In 2017, the company began leading a consortium to develop a laser directed-energy weapon technology demonstrator, named Dragonfire, for the UK MOD.

In 2018, MBDA UK opened a new facility in Bolton to carry out final assembly work for Meteor for all six European partner nations. By 2018, the missile had achieved marked export success, with export sales to India, Saudi Arabia, South Korea, Brazil and Egypt, among other countries. Since 2014, MBDA UK also collaborated with Japan to produce a Japanese Meteor-derived missile, known as JNAAM. During the same year, the company joined other leading British defence companies in Team Tempest, a consortium led by BAE Systems to develop the BAE Systems Tempest fighter aircraft. The company's responsibilities are to provide advanced weapon systems, including the integration of SPEAR 3 and Meteor missiles, electronic warfare capabilities and an anti-ship cruise missile which is still in development.

The company's sales to Saudi Arabia, particularly of Brimstone and Storm Shadow ground-attack missiles, received increased scrutiny following the Saudi Arabian-led intervention in Yemen and Saudi Arabia's alleged war crimes. The potential complicity of MBDA UK in these crimes became the subject of a 300-page report submitted to the International Criminal Court by the European Centre for Constitutional and Human Rights in 2019.

Overview

MBDA UK is headquartered in Stevenage, England. It has a workforce of 4,000 employees and has sites in Bristol, Bolton and Stevenage. It is the only part of MBDA with a Special Security Agreement (SSA) with the U.S. Department of Defense, allowing it to carry out classified activities in the United States. Chris Allam has been the company's Managing Director since 2018.

Products

Air-launched missiles
 Meteor beyond-visual-range missile (prime contractor in a joint venture with MBDA France, MBDA Germany and MBDA Italy)
 ASRAAM short-range air-to-air missile
 Brimstone ground-attack missile
 SPEAR 3 ground-attack missile
 Storm Shadow cruise missile (joint venture)
 ALARM anti-radiation missile

Surface-based missiles
 CAMM 
Land Ceptor (CAMM-L) surface-to-air missile
CAMM-ER surface-to-air-missile (joint venture with MBDA Italy)
Sea Ceptor surface-to-air missile
 Rapier surface-to-air missile (originally developed by BAC)
 Brimstone Sea Spear surface-to-surface missile
 Sea Venom anti-ship missile (joint venture)
 Sea Wolf surface-to-air missile (originally developed by BAC)
 Sea Dart surface-to-air missile (originally developed by Hawker-Siddeley)
 Fire Shadow loitering munition

Other
 Future Cruise/Anti-Ship Weapon (multi-platform hypersonic cruise missile) (joint venture with MBDA France)

References

Aerospace companies
Aerospace companies of the United Kingdom
Defence companies of the United Kingdom
Guided missile manufacturers
BAE Systems joint ventures
Manufacturing companies established in 2001